BulletBoys is the first album from the American glam metal band BulletBoys, released in 1988.  The cover art is a copy of ".30 Bullet Piercing an Apple" by Harold Eugene Edgerton.  The album features the hit "Smooth Up In Ya" as well as a cover of The O'Jay's song "For the Love of Money". The album reached No. 34 in the Billboard 200 chart and was certified gold in 1989 selling over 500,000 copies.

UK-based Rock Candy Records reissued this album on CD in 2014.

Track listing
 "Hard as a Rock" – 3:03
 "Smooth Up in Ya" – 4:23
 "Owed to Joe" – 2:45
 "Shoot the Preacher Down" – 3:37
 "For the Love of Money" (The O'Jays cover) – 3:44
 "Kissin' Kitty" – 3:06
 "Hell on My Heels" – 3:22
 "Crank Me Up" – 3:37
 "Badlands" – 3:07
 "F#9" – 3:19

Singles  
"Smooth Up in Ya" (US Hot 100 #71, US Mainstream Rock #23)
"For the Love of Money" (US Hot 100 #78, US Mainstream Rock #38)

Personnel
Band members
 Marq Torien - lead vocals
 Mick Sweda - guitar, backing vocals
 Lonnie Vincent - bass, backing vocals
 Jimmy D'Anda - drums

Production
Ted Templeman - producer
Jeff Hendrickson - engineer, associate producer
Toby Wright - engineer
George Marino - mastering

References

1988 debut albums
BulletBoys albums
Warner Records albums
Albums produced by Ted Templeman